Niclas Burström (born January 25, 1991) is a Swedish professional ice hockey defenceman who currently plays for IK Oskarshamn in the Swedish Hockey League (SHL).

Playing career
Burström played as a youth in his native Sweden within the program of Skellefteå AIK of the Swedish Hockey League (SHL). He made his professional debut in the 2008–09 season.

On September 28, 2012, Burström as an emerging defenseman signed a four-year contract extension to remain with Champions Skellefteå.

After completing his tenth season within Skellefteå's organization following the 2016–17 season, Burström left as a free agent seeking a new challenge in agreeing to a two-year contract with Russian club, HC Vityaz of the KHL on May 3, 2017.  In the 2017–18 season, Burström appeared in 29 games from the blueline, registering just 1 goal. On November 19, 2017, he was traded by Vityaz to Yugra, recapturing his form to play out the season with 6 points in 24 games.

Having returned to the SHL with the Växjö Lakers for the 2018–19 season, Burström then returned to original hometown club, Skellefteå AIK, agreeing on a two-year contract on 11 April 2019.

Following a lone season in the Deutsche Eishockey Liga (DEL) with the Schwenninger Wild Wings, Burström returned to the SHL after securing a three-year contract with IK Oskarshman on 16 April 2022.

Career statistics

Regular season and playoffs

International

Awards and honours

References

External links

1991 births
Living people
IK Oskarshamn players
People from Skellefteå Municipality
Schwenninger Wild Wings players
Skellefteå AIK players
Swedish ice hockey defencemen
Växjö Lakers players
HC Vityaz players
HC Yugra players
Sportspeople from Västerbotten County